Costa Deliziosa is a cruise ship flagship operated by Costa Crociere. Ordered in 2007 as part of a five-ship expansion of the Costa Cruises Fleet, Costa Deliziosa was constructed by Fincantieri, launched in March 2009, and handed over to Costa Crociere in January 2010.

Design and construction

The keel was laid down at the company's shipyard in Ancona. In July 2008, after the keel and first section were completed, they were towed to the Marghera shipyard for further work. She was launched on 12 March 2009, when water was admitted to the drydock in which she was built. The ship was handed over to Costa Cruises on 31 January 2010 at the Venice Passenger Terminal. Costa Deliziosa is the third ship to be delivered by Fincantieri to Costa Cruises in a nine-month period, and one of five new ships to be in service with the company by 2012; a 50 percent expansion in the fleet's passenger capacity.

The ship has a gross tonnage of 92,700. Up to 2,828 passengers can be carried in 1,130 cabins. Around 3,000 people worked on the construction of Costa Deliziosa which cost more than €450 million .

Christening
Costa Deliziosa was christened at Port Rashid in the United Arab Emirates on 23 February, during her inaugural voyage, which started from Savona on 5 February; the first cruise ship in the world to be christened in an Arabian city. In deference to the Muslim faith of Dubai a bottle of special date juice was used rather than the traditional sparkling wine, champagne, or prosecco usually used to christen ships. The christening was planned to coincide with the opening ceremony for the new Port Rashid cruise ship terminal.

Ports of call

The ship spent the first part of her career operating on seven-day cruises in the Persian Gulf. During the northern summer, the ship relocated to Copenhagen, for seven-day cruises through the Baltic region.

On 28 December 2011, Costa Deliziosa embarked on a 100-day round-the-world cruise. Departing from Savona, the ship visited the Caribbean, Los Angeles, San Francisco, Hawaii, Samoa, Fiji, New Zealand, Australia, Singapore, Thailand, Sri Lanka, the United Arab Emirates, and Egypt, before returning to Italy.

In 2013 the ship left Northern Europe. Between spring and fall, Costa Deliziosa operated in the Mediterranean Sea, the Canary Islands and Black Sea. All cruises start from Savona. From January to April 2013, and in 2014, she undertook a 100-night world cruise. It was on this world cruise that the vessel rescued eight sailors whose boat had hit an unidentified object mid-Atlantic. The ship's course was altered to rescue the sailors, before it continued to Antigua. 

From 2015, every summer she operates in the Eastern Mediterranean region and more specifically she offers cruises to Greece and Croatia. In the winter period she does world cruises.

Incidents

Coronavirus pandemic 

During the COVID-19 pandemic, on 3 April 2020, the ship was docked in Muscat, Oman with 1830 guests and 899 crew members; at that time, the company, Costa Crociere, was working to find a suitable port for the ship's final destination. The passengers and crew were observing social distancing and sanitation guidelines.

After not being allowed to have any passengers leave the ship when it arrived in Fremantle, Australia, Costa Deliziosa continued to Europe. On 20 April 183 passengers from the Iberian Peninsula and 112 from France left the vessel when it docked in Barcelona. No cases of COVID-19 had been reported to authorities as of that date. The ship then headed to Genoa, with 1519 passengers and 898 crew members aboard, where it docked on 22 April 2020. It is likely that Costa Deliziosa was the penultimate cruise ship to unload all its passengers during the pandemic, with  being the only ship left with passengers on board as of 21 April 2020.

Gallery

Similar ships
  - a similar class of Panamax ships operated by Carnival Cruise Lines.
  - a similar class of Panamax ships operated by Royal Caribbean International
  - a similar Panamax ship operated by P&O Cruises.
  - a similar Panamax sized ship operated by Cunard Line.
  - a similar class of Panamax ships operated by Holland America Line
 Signature-class cruise ship - a similar class of Panamax ships operated by Holland America Line
  and  - a similar set of Panamax ships operated by Princess Cruises

References

External links 

 

Ships of Costa Cruises
Ships built in Venice
Panamax cruise ships
2009 ships
Ships built by Fincantieri